Yecha Gunja Parthasarathy (born Y G Parthasarathy; 30 September 1917 – 1990) was an Indian playwright, drama troupe owner and actor who founded the drama troupe United Amateur Artistes (UAA) along with his friend Padmanabhan in 1952. His wife Y G Rajalakshmi was a popular educationist while his son Y G Mahendra is an actor. Veteran Actress Vyjayanthimala is his niece.

Filmography

References 

 

1917 births
1990 deaths
20th-century Indian dramatists and playwrights
20th-century Indian male actors
Male actors in Tamil cinema